Dančo Celeski (born 9 September 1967) is a retired Macedonian football goalkeeper, who last played for FK Karaorman.

Club career
Celeski started his career with Zastava Belchishta and had spells in Hungary and Turkey.

International career 
He made his senior debut for North Macedonia in an October 1994 European Championship qualification match against Spain in Skopje and has earned a total of 22 caps, scoring no goals. His final international was an October 1997 FIFA World Cup qualification match against Lithuania.

References

External sources
Profile at MacedonianFootball.com 

1967 births
Living people
Sportspeople from Ohrid
Association football goalkeepers
Macedonian footballers
North Macedonia international footballers
FK Ohrid players
FK Makedonija Gjorče Petrov players
Kayserispor footballers
Nyíregyháza Spartacus FC players
FK Karaorman players
Süper Lig players
Nemzeti Bajnokság I players
Nemzeti Bajnokság II players
Macedonian Second Football League players
Macedonian expatriate footballers
Expatriate footballers in Turkey
Macedonian expatriate sportspeople in Turkey
Expatriate footballers in Hungary
Macedonian expatriate sportspeople in Hungary
Macedonian football managers
FK Ohrid managers